Zangle Cove is a bay in the U.S. state of Washington.

Zangle Cove derives its name from Martin , a local landholder.

References

Landforms of Thurston County, Washington
Bays of Washington (state)